Christopher "Cade" Courtley (born December 30, 1969) is a retired American television host and a former Navy SEAL. He was the host of Spike TV's and Discovery Channel's show Surviving Disaster and Sportsman Channel's America Unplugged. He was also the author of a book, entitled SEAL Survival Guide: A Navy SEAL's Secrets to Surviving Any Disaster.

References

External links
 SealSurvival.com - Cade Courtley Official Website
 
 
 
 
 Cade Courtley author list at Amazon.ca

1969 births
Living people
American television talk show hosts
Participants in American reality television series
United States Navy sailors
United States Navy SEALs personnel
University of San Diego alumni